Modern Daughters is a 1927 American silent drama film directed by Charles J. Hunt and starring Edna Murphy, Bryant Washburn and Ernest Hilliard.

Cast
 Edna Murphy
 Bryant Washburn
 Ernest Hilliard
 Virginia Lyons
 J.C. Fowler
 Hazel Flint

References

Bibliography
 Munden, Kenneth White. The American Film Institute Catalog of Motion Pictures Produced in the United States, Part 1. University of California Press, 1997.

External links
 

1927 films
1927 drama films
1920s English-language films
American silent feature films
Silent American drama films
American black-and-white films
Films directed by Charles J. Hunt
Rayart Pictures films
1920s American films